The Carrión is a river in northern Spain.  Its source is in the mountain range called Fuentes Carrionas, and it is a tributary of the river Pisuerga.  The entire course of the river is within the province of Palencia.

See also 
 List of rivers of Spain

Rivers of Palencia
Rivers of Castile and León
Rivers of Spain
Tributaries of the Pisuerga